Ahmed Abdul Rahman Al-Samawi (born 1946) is a Yemeni economist.  He was the Governor of the Central Bank of Yemen for thirteen years. He is currently a member of the 'Consultative' Shura Council of the Republic of Yemen.

Education

 (1976) Higher Studies Diploma, The University of Manchester, U.K.
 (1969 - 1970) Higher Studies Diploma, Kuwait Institute for Economic and Social Planning, Kuwait.
 (1968) B.A. in economics, Alexandria University.
 Secondary education, Cairo, Egypt.

Career

 2010–present – Member of the Yemeni Shura Council, Upper house of Yemen.
 1997 - 2010 – Governor of the Central Bank of Yemen.
 1991 - 1997 – Adviser, Presidential Council and member of Supreme Elections Committee.
 1985 - 1990 – chairman of the board of directors and CEO of Yemen Bank for Reconstruction & Development.
 1983 - 1985 – Executive Director of Arab Monetary Fund (AMF), Abu Dhabi.
 1980 - 1983 – Manager, The Office of the Prime Minister of Yemen.
 1978 - 1980 – Minister of Finance of Yemen.
 1977 - 1978 – Deputy Minister of Finance of Yemen.
 1976 - 1977 – Chairman of the Technical Office of the Prime Minister.
 1974 - 1976 – Deputy Minister of Finance of Yemen.
 1972 - 1974 – Chairman of the Budget Central office.
 1968 - 1972 – General Manager, Banking and Monetary Policy department, Ministry of Economy.

Publications

Books
 2021 – Al-Kaskul (Experiences- Journeys- Stories- Banks- Money- Conferences- Messages and Images)
 2020 – Concepts and Terminology in Economics, Finance and Banking
 2020 – Selections from My Life
 2018 – Public Finance- the features of the financial history of Yemen and the preparation of the first budget in its history
 2017 – Banks History & Features and Yemen's Experience in Monetary Policy and Banking Sector Reform
 2016 – Currency and Yemeni Heritage from Pre-Islamic Times Till Modern Era
 2014 – Off To The Wide Universe: Memories of an Expatriate Child
 2014 – Between the West and the East (a trip to European cities and Mumbai, India)
 2013 – Reflections on Life and the Universe.  
 2012 – Stages in my life and taking part in building modern Yemen. 
 2007 – Yemen's experiences of monetary policy and banking reform. 
 1969 – The Ideal Use of Loans: the Development Challenge in the Yemen Arab Republic. 
 1971 – External Loans and Grants for Economic and Social Development.

Articles

In the Age of Giant Trading Blocs, the fate of Inter-Arab Trade, Althowra Daily.
Privatization : Selling the Public Sector to the Private Sector, Althowra Daily.

Publications in the field of travel writing

Journey to the Lost Paradise, Andalusia.
Journey to the City of two Continents, Istanbul.
Journey to the Paradise which Adam lost, Bali.

Other activities

Participated in several discussions of topics related to economics and Political Economy.
Participated in several Economic conferences in Yemen and around the world.

See also
Economy of Yemen
Yemeni rial
Central Bank of Yemen

References 

 http://www.centralbank.gov.ye/news.aspx?keyid=63&pid=60&lang=1&cattype=2
 https://archive.today/20130105182812/http://www.yobserver.com/business-and-economy/10012882.html
 http://www.ifc.org/IFCExt/pressroom/IFCPressRoom.nsf/0/E8AC0F0757541A338525757B00592DEF?
 http://www.al-tagheer.com/news.php?id=14521
 http://archives.mees.com/issues/743/articles/29219
OpenDocument
 https://web.archive.org/web/20110531154203/http://www.amf.org.ae/content/governors

1946 births
Living people
20th-century economists
20th-century Yemeni people
21st-century Yemeni people
Alexandria University alumni
Alumni of the University of Manchester
Finance ministers of Yemen
Governors of the Central Bank of Yemen
People from Dhamar Governorate
Yemeni economists